Da Milano means "of Milan" in Italian. It may refer to the following people:
 Aloisio da Milano, Italian architect who worked in Muscovy
 Francesco Canova da Milano, Italian composer for lute, early 16th century
 Giovanni da Milano, Italian painter of the 14th century

Surnames of Italian origin